Maurice Arbez (22 September 1944 – 30 October 2020) was a French ski jumper. He competed in the normal hill and large hill events at the 1968 Winter Olympics.

References

External links
 

1944 births
2020 deaths
French male ski jumpers
Olympic ski jumpers of France
Ski jumpers at the 1968 Winter Olympics
People from Les Rousses
Sportspeople from Jura (department)